Klingville is a populated place in Chassell Township within southeastern Houghton County in the US state of Michigan.

US Highway 41 passes  to the east with Keweenaw Bay of Lake Superior  to the east.

References

Unincorporated communities in Houghton County, Michigan
Unincorporated communities in Michigan